Chabiwali Pocket Watch is a 2006 short film written and directed by Vibhu Puri and produced by the Film and Television Institute of India. The film is set in Old Delhi and deals with the story of a romantic Urdu poet, now dying anonymously, and the struggle between his daughter and an opportunist publisher. The film was the official entry from India to the Student Academy Awards. It was also a chosen to be a part of Indian Panorama in 2006.

At the 53rd National Film Awards, director Vibhu Puri received the Special Jury Award. In 2013, it was amongst many FTII student films to be telecasted by the state-run Doordarshan channel.

Synopsis

Urdu, the Hindustani language whose words resonate music, is fast dying. So is Babba, an old Urdu poet who is dying an unknown death. Having shut his eyes to the callous world that weighs art with money, he has woven a charming little world of his own. Babba's state of nonchalant bliss inadvertently drives his daughter Minni into a world of bitter silences. And across the road lives Pappan, a small-time debt-ridden publisher who is eyeing Babba's treasured verses and his beautiful daughter. A self-indulgent, romantic old man, a stoic but essentially soft-hearted daughter and an opportunist but naive publisher. Amidst all this, Babba, Minni and Pappan struggle to keep their culture alive, their ethos alive, their language alive, their love alive, in vain.

Cast

 Lalit Mohan Tiwari as Babba
 Jameel Khan as Pappan
 Gayatri Kachru as Minni

Festivals

 Cannes Film Festival
 Sydney international Film Festival
 International Film Festival of India, Goa
 Pune International Film Festival
 International Film School Festival, Poland
 IAAC Film Festival, NY 
 KARA, Karachi
 JIFF, Jamshedpur
 Pulotsav, Pune
 SIFF, Seoul
 MIFF, Mumbai, ‘08
 Cork Film fest, ‘08

Awards
 Best Feature at IBDA’A Awards, Dubai
 Special Kodak Award for the director at the 13th International Film School Festival, Poland
 Special Jury Award for the director Vibhu Puri, 53rd National Film Awards, 2006 
 Winner, Asia Pacific Kodak Filmschool Competition, 2006
 Best Cinematography award in the 'Emerging Filmmakers' section, Cannes Film Festival: Anay Goswamy

References

 https://web.archive.org/web/20110709005140/http://archive.deccanherald.com/deccanherald/nov292006/national15292120061129.asp
 http://paash.wordpress.com/2010/07/30/vibhu-puri-master-storyteller/

2006 films
Indian short films
2000s Hindi-language films
2000s Urdu-language films
Student films
Films about writers
Films set in Delhi
Urdu-language Indian films